Major-General James Hanson Salmond (1766–1837) was an officer in the East India Company's Forces who went on to be Military Secretary to the East India Company.

Military career
Salmond, a subaltern in the East India Company's Forces, was commissioned into the British Army in 1796. He was appointed Adjutant of the 1st Regiment of Royal East India Volunteers later that year.

He was appointed Military Secretary to the East India Company in 1809 and promoted to Major-General in 1837.

He also wrote a history of the Anglo-Mysore Wars.

Family
In 1798 he married Louisa Scott and then in 1808 he married Rachel Mary Ann Constable.

By his first wife, he had a son, Lieutenant Colonel James Salmond (1805-1880), who married Emma Isabella Coke (d. 1886), daughter of D'ewes Coke (1774-1856). One of their sons was Sir William Salmond.

By his second wife, he had a son, Edward Salmond (1809-1821).

Ancestry

References

 

1766 births
1837 deaths
British East India Company Army generals
British military writers